(They All Should Go), often written Yetnahaw ga3 !, is a slogan in Algerian Arabic (يتنحاو ڨاع), which appeared during the protests that took place in Algeria from 2019 to early 2021. It has become a sort of rallying cry of internet surfers since the publication of a video on social media showing a young Algerian interrupting a local correspondent of the television channel Sky News Arabia, on the evening of 11 March 2019 where ex-president Abdelaziz Bouteflika announced he was giving up a fifth term. The idea behind this slogan is that anyone who has led or participated in any way in the governance of the country should be hunted.

History 
On 11 March 2019, a 33-year-old Algerian citizen, Sofiane Bakir Turki, interrupted the direction of a journalist who commented on the event in Modern Standard Arabic in a large boulevard of Algiers, the young man affirming in Algerian Arabic: "Yetnahaw gaa!".

"Yatnahaw gaa!" Is the departure of all those who have benefited, contributed, participated, strengthened and protected the ex-president during the 20 years of his reign, failing which, any attempt to transition to a democratic model risks to be torpedoed by these individuals when we speak of counter-revolution, it is of these that it is. The video made a buzz the day after the announcement of the president and went viral. Netizens used a hashtag #Yetnahaw_Ga3. This is the most common slogan in all the events. It has been used on banners since March 2019 and the local and international media often mention it to report on the events in Algeria.

At the 72nd edition of the Cannes Film Festival, Algerian actors brandished signs and badges mentioning the slogan "Yetnahaw ga3!" in support of the Algerian protesters.

References

2019 protests
2019–2021 Algerian protests
Political catchphrases